Head is the sixth studio album by the Monkees, and the soundtrack to the film of the same name. Released in 1968, the album primarily consists of musique concrète pieces assembled from the film's dialogue. The six new songs encompass genres such as psychedelic music, lo-fi, acid rock and Broadway theatre.

Composition
After the TV series The Monkees was cancelled in Spring of 1968, the band regrouped and wrote the film Head with screenwriter Jack Nicholson, who later coordinated the soundtrack album, editing dialogue excerpts from the film into the album's composition. The album approximates the flow of the movie and includes large portions of the dialogue. CriterionCast has suggested that the album's composition was influenced by Frank Zappa's Lumpy Gravy album. Peter Tork said regarding the album's composition, "[Nicholson] made it different from the movie. There's a line in the movie where Zappa says, 'That's pretty white.' Then there's another line in the movie that was not juxtaposed in the movie, but Nicholson put them together in the [soundtrack album], when Mike says, 'And the same thing goes for Christmas' [...] that was very important and wonderful that he assembled the record differently from the movie [...] It was a different artistic experience."

PopMatters described Head as "a hypnogogic hallucination of a 60’s pop record" whose composition encompassed musique concrète pieces and six new songs in the genres of psychedelic, Broadway and lo-fi rock. It was the first Monkees album to not include a song written by Tommy Boyce and Bobby Hart. Some of the album showcases the songwriting skills of band members, particularly Peter Tork, whose acid rock song  "Long Title: Do I Have to Do This All Over Again" and the "Eastern-flavored" song "Can You Dig It?" were described by AllMusic as being "not only among the best of the six original compositions on the soundtrack, but also among his finest Monkees offerings, period."

Release

In 1986, Rhino Entertainment repressed vinyl record copies of the album. In 1994, the album was reissued on compact disc with six bonus tracks, including a live version of "Circle Sky", and an alternate version of "Daddy's Song" featuring Michael Nesmith on vocals instead of Davy Jones. In 2010, Rhino reissued the album in a deluxe box set on three compact discs. The following year, Rhino Handmade reissued Head on vinyl for the first time since its original 1968 release. A bootleg of the album was also released at an unknown date, containing 100 tracks.

Reception

MusicHound described Head as a "trippy little souvenir of the times". AllMusic wrote that "Without question, both the movie and album are the most adventurous and in many ways most fulfilling undertaking to have been born of the Monkees' multimedia manufactured project." PopMatters called Head "an almost accidental youngster’s gateway to the avant-garde; there is a clear line for clued-in pre-teens leading from Head’s “Opening Ceremony” and “Swami—Plus Strings, Etc.” to the Beatles’ “Revolution 9″, and from there to Yoko Ono, Stockhausen, Krautrock, postpunk, and a million other directions." In 2013, Rolling Stone ranked the album at number 25 in their list of "The 25 Greatest Soundtracks of All Time".

Track listing

Session information
Credits adapted from AllMusic.

Personnel
The Monkees
Micky Dolenz - vocals; drums on live version of "Circle Sky"
Davy Jones - vocals; maracas and organ on live version of "Circle Sky"
Mike Nesmith - vocals, electric guitar on "Circle Sky" (live and studio versions) and "Daddy's Song", acoustic guitar on "Daddy's Song", electric organ and maracas on "Circle Sky" (studio version)
Peter Tork - vocals, electric guitar on "Can You Dig It" and "Long Title: Do I Have To Do This All Over Again?"; bass guitar on live version of "Circle Sky"
with

Ken Bloom – guitar
Danny Kortchmar – guitar on "As We Go Along"
Leon Russell – keyboard
Ralph Shuckett – keyboard
Douglas Lubahn – electric bass
Mike Ney – drums
William Hinshaw – horn
Jules Jacob – horn
Gregory Bemko – cello
David Filerman – cello
Jan Kelly – cello
Jacqueline Lustgarten – cello
Max Bennett – string bass
Clyde Hoggan – string bass
James Hughart – string bass
Jerry Scheff – string bass
Michel Rubini – piano
Keith Allison – guitar
Bill Chadwick – guitar
Richard Dey – bass
John Gross – bass
Eddie Hoh – drums, cowbell
Lance Wakely – guitar, bass
Dewey Martin – drums
Michael A. Glass – percussion
Ry Cooder – guitar on "As We Go Along"
Neil Young – guitar on "As We Go Along"
Carole King – guitar on "As We Go Along"
Harvey Newmark – bass
Earl Palmer – drums
Dennis Bruce – percussion
Stephen Stills – guitar on "Long Title"
Pete Candoli – trumpet
Marion Childers – trumpet
Anthony Terran – trumpet
Richard Leith – trombone
Lewis McCreary – trombone
Justin Ditullio – cello
Raphael Kramer – cello
Emmet Sargent – cello
Eleanor Slatkin – cello
Brendan Cahill – percussion
Jack Nitzsche – arrangement on "Porpoise Song" and "As We Go Along"
Russ Titelman – conductor on "Porpoise Song"
John R. Hoening – unknown
Tony McCashen – unknown
Unknown – organ and flute

All songs produced by The Monkees unless otherwise specified

Opening Ceremony
Spoken words: Charles Irving, Micky Dolenz, June Fairchild, Teri Garr, I. J. Jefferson, Ray Nitschke and Unknown
Between February 11 - August 3, 1968
Includes dialogue from "Porpoise Song", "As We Go Along", "Daddy's Song", and the live version of "Circle Sky".

Porpoise Song (Theme from Head)
Written by Gerry Goffin and Carole King
Lead vocal by Micky Dolenz
Backing vocals: Davy Jones, and Unknown
Guitar: Ken Bloom, Danny "Kootch" Kortchmar
Bass: Doug Lubahn
Drums: Michael Ney, John Raines
Percussion: Michael Ney, John Raines
Cymbals: Russ Titelman
Keyboard: Leon Russell, Ralph Schuckett
Cello: Gregory Bemko, David Filerman, Jan Kelley, Jacqueline Lustgarten
Double Bass: Max Bennett, Clyde "Whitey" Hoggan, Jim Hughart, Jerry Scheff
Brass: Bill Hinshaw, Jules Jacob
Woodwind: Bill Hinshaw, Jules Jacob
Produced by Gerry Goffin
Recorded at California Recorders, Hollywood, February 26, and 28, 1968

Ditty Diego — War Chant
Written by Jack Nicholson and Bob Rafelson
Vocals by Michael Nesmith, Peter Tork, Micky Dolenz and Davy Jones
Piano: Michel Rubini
Recorded at RCA Victor Studios, Hollywood, August 3, 1968

Circle Sky
Written by Michael Nesmith
Lead vocal by Michael Nesmith
Guitar: Michael Nesmith, Keith Allison, Bill Chadwick
Drums: Eddie Hoh
Organ: Michael Nesmith
Percussion: Michael Nesmith, Eddie Hoh
Recorded at RCA Victor Studios, Hollywood, December 9 and 17, 1967 and January 6 and 8, 1968

Supplicio
Spoken words: Unknown
Between February 11 - August 3, 1968

Can You Dig It?
Written by Peter Tork
Lead vocal by Micky Dolenz
Guitar: Peter Tork, Lance Wakely
Bass: Lance Wakely
Bongos: Unknown
Cymbals: Unknown
Percussion: Unknown
Tambourine: Unknown
Unknown: Chester Anderson, Don DeMieri, Michael A. Glass, Eddie Hoh
Recorded at Western Recorders, January 28 and February 1, and RCA Victor Studios, Hollywood, January 29, 30, 31 and March 8, 1968

Gravy
Spoken words by Davy Jones and I. J. Jefferson
Between February 11 - August 3, 1968

Superstitious
Spoken words: David Manners, Bela Lugosi
Lugosi dialogue from The Black Cat, Universal, 1934

As We Go Along
Written by Carole King and Toni Stern
Lead vocal by Micky Dolenz
Guitar: Ken Bloom, Ry Cooder, Carole King, Danny "Kootch" Kortchmar, Tony McCashen, Neil Young
Bass: Harvey Newmark
Drums: Earl Palmer
Percussion: Denny Bruce, John Raines
Organ: Unknown
Flute: Unknown
Recorded at Wally Heider's, Hollywood, May 30, and Original Sound, Hollywood, August 1, 1968

Dandruff?
Spoken words by Micky Dolenz, Davy Jones, Michael Nesmith, Peter Tork, Charles Macaulay, Logan Ramsey, Film Officer, and Film Director
Between February 11 - August 3, 1968
Includes dialogue from "Superstitious".

Daddy's Song
Written by Harry Nilsson
Lead vocal by Davy Jones
Electric Guitar: Michael Nesmith
Acoustic Guitar: Michael Nesmith
Bass: Rick Dey
Drums: Eddie Hoh
Piano: Eleanor Slatkin
Cello: Justin DiTullio, Ray Kramer, Emmet Sargeant, Eleanor Slatkin
Trumpet: Pete Candoli, Buddy Childers, Tony Terran
Trombone: Richard Leith, Lewis McCreary
Unknown: Keith Allison, Bill Chadwick
Recorded at RCA Victor Studios, January 10, 16, 19 and March 1, and Sunset Sound, Hollywood, April 4, 1968

Poll
Spoken words by Michael Nesmith, Davy Jones, Peter Tork, Frank Zappa, Timothy Carey, Man 1, Man 2, and Man 3
Between February 11 - August 3, 1968
Includes dialogue from the studio version of "Circle Sky".

Long Title: Do I Have to Do This All Over Again?
Written by Peter Tork
Lead vocal by Peter Tork
Backing vocal: Davy Jones, Peter Tork
Guitar: Peter Tork, Stephen Stills, Lance Wakely
Bass: Lance Wakely
Drums: Dewey Martin
Tambourine: Unknown
Recorded at Western Recorders, January 20, 28 and February 1, 3, 4, 5, 10 and 14, RCA Victor Studios, January 22, 27 and February 12, and Sunset Sound, Hollywood, January 25 and 26, 1968
The song was recorded over a large number of sessions and was originally intended for The Birds, The Bees & The Monkees.

Swami - Plus Strings, Etc.
Written by Ken Thorne
Vocals by Micky Dolenz, Abraham Sofaer, June Fairchild, Teri Garr, I. J. Jefferson, Timothy Carey, Ray Nitschke and Unknown
Between February 11 - August 3, 1968
Includes dialogue from "Porpoise Song", "As We Go Along", "Daddy's Song", and the live version of "Circle Sky".

1994 bonus tracks session information

Ditty Diego — War Chant [First Recorded Version]
Vocals by Michael Nesmith, Peter Tork, Micky Dolenz, Davy Jones, Jack Nicholson and Bob Rafelson
Recorded at RCA Victor Studios, Hollywood, July 25, 1968

Circle Sky [Live Version]
Lead vocal by Michael Nesmith
Electric Guitar: Michael Nesmith
Bass: Peter Tork
Drums: Micky Dolenz
Percussion: Davy Jones
Organ: Davy Jones
Recorded at Valley Auditorium, and Lagoon Park Amusement Center, Salt Lake City, UT, May 21, 1968

Happy Birthday to You
Written by Mildred Hill and Patty Smith Hill
Lead vocals by Micky Dolenz, Davy Jones, Peter Tork
Organ: Michel Rubini
Recorded at RCA Victor Studios, Hollywood, August 3, 1968

Can You Dig It? [Early Mix]
Lead vocal by Peter Tork
An earlier mix of the song with a lead vocal by Peter Tork.

Daddy's Song [Early Mix]
Lead vocal by Michael Nesmith
An earlier mix of the song with a lead vocal by Michael Nesmith

Head Radio Spot
Spoken words: Charles Irving, Micky Dolenz, June Fairchild, Teri Garr, I. J. Jefferson, Ray Nitschke and Unknown
Between February 11 - August 3, 1968
Includes dialogue from "Opening Ceremony", "Porpoise Song", "Can You Dig It", "As We Go Along", "Daddy's Song", "Long Title", and the live version of "Circle Sky".

Charts

Album

Single

References

Further reading
 
 

The Monkees albums
Film soundtracks
1968 soundtrack albums
RCA Records soundtracks
Rhino Records soundtracks
Albums produced by Gerry Goffin
Colgems Records soundtracks
Albums produced by Micky Dolenz
Albums produced by Davy Jones (musician)
Albums produced by Michael Nesmith
Albums produced by Peter Tork
Albums conducted by Russ Titelman
Albums arranged by Jack Nitzsche
Albums recorded at Sunset Sound Recorders
Albums recorded at Wally Heider Studios
Albums recorded at United Western Recorders